Yell Township is one of seventeen townships in Boone County, Iowa, USA.  As of the 2000 census, its population was 2,273.

History
Yell Township was organized in 1852. It is named for Colonel Archibald Yell, who fell at the Battle of Buena Vista.

Geography
According to the USGS, it contains six cemeteries: Bluff Creek, Buckley, Hickory Grove, Milton Lott Grave, Mount Olive and Rose Hill.

References

External links
 US-Counties.com
 City-Data.com

Townships in Boone County, Iowa
Townships in Iowa
1852 establishments in Iowa